The Grape Shot is a shipwreck located off the coast of Plum Island, Wisconsin.

History
The Grape Shot was a 130-foot centerboard schooner. It was built by B. B. Jones in Buffalo, New York in 1855. The vessel primarily transported lumber, wheat and coal.

In November of 1867, the vessel was driven aground by a gale. Attempts were made to salvage it. Though they were unsuccessful, the cargo and the ship's rigging and deck gear were removed.

The site was added to the National Register of Historic Places in 2016.

References

Shipwrecks on the National Register of Historic Places in Wisconsin
National Register of Historic Places in Door County, Wisconsin
Shipwrecks of the Wisconsin coast
Shipwrecks of Lake Michigan